The 2016 Asian Canoe Slalom Championships was the 9th edition of the Asian Canoe Slalom Championships. The event took place from 23 to 24 April 2016 in Toyama, Japan. The event was the only Asian qualification for the 2016 Summer Olympics in Rio de Janeiro.

Medal summary

Individual

Team

Medal table

References

Results

External links
Official website

Asian Canoe Slalom Championships
Canoe
Asian Canoeing Championships
International sports competitions hosted by Japan